Radanovci may refer to the following villages:
 Radanovci, Livno, in Bosnia and Herzegovina
 Radanovci, Kosjerić, in Serbia

See also
 Radanovići (disambiguation)